Abdulhakim Arvasi or Sayyeed Abd al Haqeem-i Arvasi (1865–1943) was a Sunni Kurdish Islamic scholar.

Life 
Arvasi was born in the village of Arvas (present-day Doğanyayla).

Arvasi lived in the times of the late Ottoman Empire and the early Republic of Turkey. He was one of the most profound Islamic scholars of his time and a mujtahid. Arvasi was a descendant of the Islamic prophet, Muhammad, and hence he had the title sayyed (seyyid in Turkish) before his name. He is the 33rd sheikh of the Naqshbandi order. He was born in Van, Turkey. He received religious education from the famous scholar and walî Seyyid Fehim-i Arvasi. He was deeply learned in many worldly and religious sciences such as: natural sciences, hadith, tafsir and tasawwuf. Arvasi taught in Van for 30 years after which he moved to Istanbul as the Russian Army had invaded the eastern part of the country. Arvasi taught in various madrasas and mosques of Istanbul for many years. One of his most famous students was Necip Fazıl Kısakürek. Arvasi died in Ankara in 1943 after decades of teaching of Islam. He is buried in Baglum Cemetery, Ankara.

Works 
 Er-Riyâd-üt-Tasavufiyye
 Râbita-i Şerîfe
 Keşkül
 Sefer-i Âhiret
 Eshâb-i Kirâm
 Ecdâd-i Peygamberî

Bibliography 
 O ve Ben p.  
 Hal Tercümesi

References

1865 births
1943 deaths
People from Van, Turkey
20th-century Muslim scholars of Islam
19th-century Muslim theologians
20th-century Muslim theologians

19th-century Kurdish people
Kurdish theologians